The Eight Schools Association (ESA) is a group of private college-preparatory schools in the Northeast United States.

Formation
It began informally during the 1973–74 school year and was formalized in 2006 with the appointment of a president and an executive director.

Member schools
The ESA member schools are:

There must be unanimous agreement among ESA schools before its membership can be expanded, and no new school has been admitted since 1974.

Principles and activities

Article 1 of the ESA by-laws states that the association was established for "the purpose of mutual support and collegiality" and that its main aims should be to "address critical educational issues in order to ensure the best educational experiences and outcomes for students, explore new research and trends in education, and develop collaborative programs".

In a May 2009 interview with the Choate student newspaper, The News, inaugural ESA president and Choate head Edward Shanahan was asked to differentiate ESA from other prep school organizations, such as the Ten Schools Admissions Organization. Shanahan mentioned "the close relationship among the eight school members" and said, "We have been together for a long period of time and there's a great deal of trust and sharing."

In August 2007, Deerfield Academy Press published the inaugural issue of an ESA literary periodical 8 × 8. In its preface, Deerfield head Margarita Curtis went beyond the idea of "peer schools" to envision a "collective". She wrote, "This kind of collaboration helps recast the highly competitive and isolating nature of the prep school enterprise in terms of a common celebration of excellence in our collective student population."

On March 4, 2010, The Phillipian reported that Patricia Russell, sustainability coordinator at Andover, was "working with other members of the Eight Schools Association to establish a competition similar to the Green Cup Challenge that would begin in October." The Green Cup Challenge is a national high school "green campus" effort.

In June 2012 occurred the first meeting of the Eight Schools Association Technology and Learning Institute (ESATLI), described in its brochure as a workshop for providing ESA faculty "the opportunity to learn about how curricular technology integration positively impacts pedagogy." Begun in 2007 at Choate, the week-long session was opened to the other ESA members in 2012, and attracted over fifty teachers, deans, and IT administrators representing all eight schools. The 2013 ESATLI will be held June 10-14 at Choate.

In February 2013, ESA executive director Edward Shanahan told the Choate News that he and Hotchkiss head Malcolm McKenzie were among a group of American and Chinese educators working to establish an American-style prep school in Beijing, to be called the Keystone Academy. Shanahan said, "We have discussed this with the heads of the Eight Schools. Our hope is that [Keystone] can be a resource for New England boarding schools." Shanahan will be Keystone's founding president and McKenzie its founding head of school. Rachael Beare, presently at Hotchkiss and formerly of Exeter and Deerfield, will be admissions dean at Keystone, which is under construction in the Shunyi district of Beijing for a September 2014 opening.

History
The ESA began as an informal gathering of heads from seven of the Eight Schools during the 1973-74 school year. After the first meeting, an invitation was extended to Northfield Mount Hermon to join the group, which over time included participation by representatives of the eight boards of trustees. In 1996 the ESA decided to expand its once-yearly get-togethers to more regular twice-yearly meetings, one for the heads and one for the trustees.

At the April 2006 meeting at Lawrenceville, the group created an administrative structure: Choate head Edward Shanahan was appointed president, Lawrenceville head Elizabeth Duffy was named vice president, and former Lawrenceville chief financial officer William Bardel was hired as executive director. Administrators' tenures were set at three years. In 2009, Shanahan was succeeded by Duffy and Bardel was succeeded by former Hotchkiss head Robert "Skip" Mattoon. In 2011 Shanahan succeeded Mattoon as executive director.

A group photo in The Lawrence of the 2006 participants shows Choate head Edward Shanahan, Deerfield head Eric Widmer, Deerfield head-elect Margarita Curtis, Hotchkiss head Robert Mattoon, Lawrenceville head Elizabeth Duffy, Northfield Mount Hermon head Thomas Sturtevant, Phillips Andover head Barbara Landis Chase, Phillips Exeter principal Tyler Tingley, and St. Paul's Rector William Matthews.

In January 2007, the aims of ESA were described in a letter sent by the school heads to their faculties. Andover head Barbara Chase's accompanying email — titled "Association of Eight Peer Schools" and dated January 26 — was posted in the blog of Andover's Oliver Wendell Holmes Library. Chase wrote: "As you will see from the letter, the Association has decided to become somewhat more formally organized. We hope that the closer association will have benefits for our collective faculties and students in the years to come." Chase invited faculty members to contribute their suggestions. "Ideas being discussed currently include a debate invitational, a joint literary publication, athletic play days, and a musical group jamboree. We also see advantages in collaborating on critical issues like pandemic preparedness."

In winter and spring of 2007, teachers and student-publication editors at the schools selected student writings for inclusion in the inaugural ESA publication. In August of that year, 8 × 8: Writings from the Eight School Association  was published by Deerfield Academy Press (colophon: "August 2007 | Tiger Press | Northampton Massachusetts USA"). The title page of the 208-page trade paperback lists eight sub-editors, one from each school, and general editor Andrea Moorhead of Deerfield. In the preface Deerfield head of school Margarita Curtis wrote, "The inaugural issue of 8 × 8 ... marks an important stage in the development of an educational coalition dedicated to fostering intellectual relationships among its members."

On October 13, 2007, Choate hosted the first "Eight Schools Association Arts Meeting," attended by 38 teachers. Keynote speaker was Jock Reynolds, director of the Yale University Art Gallery and former director of the Addison Gallery of American Art at Andover. In April 2008 Lawrenceville hosted the first "Eight Schools Association Jazz Festival."

In a 2008 progress report, ESA president Shanahan wrote: "Under the aegis of Executive Director Robert 'Skip' Mattoon, former Head of Hotchkiss, the first anthology of student writings from the Eight Schools has been published. The first Eight Schools basketball supremacy cup tournament took place this winter, with Choate hosting the boys varsity teams, and Hotchkiss hosting the girls varsity teams. This past fall, Choate also hosted two Eight Schools events: a meeting of the Eight Schools arts departments held at the Paul Mellon Arts Center and a meeting and luncheon for Eight Schools student leaders."

On April 16, 2010, the Paul Mellon Arts Center at Choate was the venue of the "Eight Schools Play Festival" comprising 10‑minute plays performed by representatives of the member schools. This event was followed nine days later by the "Eight Schools Theater Festival", again held at the Mellon Center, with the participation of six ESA schools.

In April 2010, Hotchkiss hosted an ESA "World Languages and Cultures" conference. Choate French teacher Katie Jewett told The News, "Fifty-four language teachers representing six different languages met for a plenary session on how culture was being incorporated into the language education. We eventually split up by each language to discuss issues such as which resources are being used in which level of classes and how the study abroad programs are run." Also in 2010, Deerfield hosted a conference of ESA science department heads.

Heads and trustees meetings

Since the 2006 institutionalization, meetings of ESA school heads and representative trustees have been held annually in April, the campus location determined by alphabetical order —  Northfield Mount Hermon in 2007, Phillips (Andover) in 2008, Phillips Exeter in 2009, St. Paul's in 2010, Choate in 2011, and Deerfield in 2012.

Choate headmaster Shanahan told The News in May 2010, "What first started out as an informal annual meeting for the eight heads of schools evolved into inviting trustees every year. Currently the heads bring two trustees to the annual spring meeting; the heads also meet over a dinner in [New York City] every December." The ESA director attends the April meeting. In a May 2009 interview with The News, Shanahan said that invited speakers at the spring meeting are "now more regular than not" and that the April 2009 session had heard Dartmouth College president emeritus James Wright talk about the "characteristics of enduring schools."

At the April 2008 meeting at Andover, the ESA invited representatives of the Association of Business Officers of Private Schools (ABOPS) to participate in a colloquium about the response of endowed schools to the international financial crisis. Financial officers from 21 ABOPS schools attended a session moderated by James P. Honan, a professor at Harvard Graduate School of Education. Lawrenceville head Duffy explained the participation of ABOPS: "The 40 or so business officers and CFOs who are part of ABOPS meet regularly to discuss financial matters. They've wanted to have a joint meeting with Heads for a few years. We decided to combine the two meetings since all the Eight Schools are part of ABOPS."

As reported in The Phillipian, the school heads' agenda included "the affordability of boarding schools, faculty issues, and various environmental initiatives". Deerfield head Margarita Curtis said that need-blind admissions continued to be an aspiration of the schools but that there were "enormous pressures on our budget". William Matthews, Rector of St. Paul's, mentioned the importance of retaining the special qualities of endowed schools, including low teacher-student ratios. "We also addressed ... making boarding school more affordable and accessible to everyone."

At the April 2009 meeting of school heads at Exeter, the main topic was again the financial climate. Choate head Edward Shanahan told The News, "Our situations are very, very similar. Everybody's budget was being cut somewhere between 7½ and 10 [percent]. Almost everybody was talking about reduction in force, cutting back some faculty or staff, and putting on hold major capital projects."

At the April 2011 meeting at Choate, it was agreed that a group of 20 to 25 faculty, comprising two or three from each school, should meet in summer and fall 2011. A principal topic of the session was the use of online and other technological tools for "hybrid" teaching, and their utility for term-abroad students, summer students, and transfer students. Hotchkiss head Malcolm McKenzie said, "I have only been at Hotchkiss for four years, but I already sense that there is a great collaboration amongst these eight schools."

At the April 2012 meeting at Deerfield, featured speakers included journalist Steven Brill (Deerfield '68), author of Class Warfare: Inside the Fight to Save America’s Schools; Timothy Knowles, director of the University of Chicago Urban Education Institute; Norman Atkins, founder of Uncommon Schools; and Mayme Hostetter, dean of the Relay Graduate School of Education.

Athletics
Athletic directors of ESA schools compose the Eight Schools Athletic Council. Like their counterpart administrators, faculty, and students, they meet to share information and organize ESA sports events and tournaments.

The inaugural tournament of the institutionalized ESA took place on December 2, 2007, when Northfield Mount Hermon hosted the "Eight Schools Wrestling Jamboree". Two weeks later Choate and Hotchkiss were venues of the boys and girls basketball "Eight Schools Holiday Tournament", December 15–16. Neither event saw the full participation of all eight schools. St. Paul's hosted the "Eight Schools Holiday Basketball Classic," December 18–19, 2009.

It will be remembered that the Ivy League began in 1945 with an agreement about football between eight college presidents and eight college athletic directors. The eight athletic directors of the ESA were coordinated by Ned Gallagher of Choate for ten years ending in 2008.

See also
 Ten Schools Admissions Organization, a similar group of private schools

References

External links
 Choate Rosemary Hall
 Deerfield Academy
 The Hotchkiss School
 The Lawrenceville School
 Northfield Mount Hermon School
 Phillips Academy
 Phillips Exeter Academy
 St. Paul's School

Educational institutions established in 1973
Preparatory schools in the United States
Youth organizations based in Connecticut
Youth organizations based in Massachusetts
Youth organizations based in New Hampshire
Youth organizations based in New Jersey
High school sports conferences and leagues in the United States